Ontochariesthes is a genus of longhorn beetles of the subfamily Lamiinae, containing the following species:

 Ontochariesthes erongoensis Adlbauer, 1996
 Ontochariesthes namibianus Adlbauer, 1996
 Ontochariesthes unicolor (Breuning, 1953)

References

Tragocephalini
Cerambycidae genera